Alfred Vierkandt (4 June 1867 – 24 April 1953) was a German sociologist, ethnographer,  social psychologist, social philosopher and philosopher of history. He is known for a broad and phenomenological Gesellschaftslehre promulgated in the 1920s, and for his formal sociology.

Vierkandt was born in Hamburg.  He first studied science and philosophy at Leipzig University. He habilitated at Brunswick. He was first at Dozent in ethnology, becoming eventually in 1913 Professor of Sociology at the University of Berlin. He was one of the founders of the Deutsche Gesellschaft für Soziologie, in 1909. He was made to retire in 1934. He died, aged 85, in Berlin.

Work

Naturvölker und Kulturvölker. Ein Beitrag zur Socialpsychologie (1896)
Die Stetigkeit im Kulturwandel: eine soziologische Studie (1908)
Allgemeine Verfassungs- und Verwaltungsgeschichte (1911) with Leopold Wenger and others
Machtverhältnis und Machtmoral (1916)
Staat und Gesellschaft in der Gegenwart: Eine Einführung in das staatsbürgerliche Denken und in die politische Bewegung unserer Zeit (1916)
 'Programm einer formalen Gesellschaftslehre' [Program for a formal theory of society], Kölner Vierteljahrshefte, ser. A, Vol. 1, No. 1 (Cologne, 1921)
Gesellschaftslehre: Hauptprobleme der philosophischen Soziologie (1923)
Der Dualismus im modernen Weltbild (1923)
Der geistig-sittliche Gehalt des neueren Naturrechtes (1927)
Allgemeine Verfassungs und Verwaltungsgeschichte  (1928)
Handwörterbuch der Soziologie (1931) editor
Familie, Volk und Staat in ihren gesellschaftlichen Lebensvorgängen: Eine Einführung in die Gesellschaftslehre (1936)
Kleine Gesellschaftslehre (1949)

References

Gegenwartsprobleme der Soziologie (1949) Festschrift
Paul Hochstim (1966) Alfred Vierkandt : a sociological critique

German sociologists
German eugenicists
1867 births
1953 deaths
Leipzig University alumni
Academic staff of the Technical University of Braunschweig
Academic staff of the Humboldt University of Berlin
German male writers